Greatest Hits (stylized as GREATE$T HIT$) is the third compilation album by American heavy metal band Mötley Crüe. It was released on October 27, 1998.

Background 
Tommy Lee recorded his drum tracks for the album's two new songs, the single "Bitter Pill" and the promo single "Enslaved" and then started a prison sentence of five months. Additionally, a remix version of "Glitter" is included. The tour for the album began after Lee's release from prison. It would be his last with the band before his return in 2004. The album does not feature any material from John Corabi's five-year tenure with the band.

The album is an updated version of the original compilation Decade of Decadence released in 1991, which is currently out of print. Its cover art features a caricature of the band by artist/designer Erik Casillas.

Although this compilation won a 1998 Metal Edge Readers' Choice Award for "Best Compilation", it misses out on some Mötley Crüe hits, such as "Live Wire", "Piece of Your Action", and "Too Young to Fall in Love".

The original pressing is now out of print and in 2009, the album was reissued with "Enslaved", "Bitter Pill" and the "Glitter" remix excluded, "Too Young to Fall in Love" and songs from Red, White and Crue and Saints of Los Angeles included and the 1997 remix of "Shout at the Devil" replaced with the original version.

Commercial performance 
The album charted at number 20 on the Billboard 200. The compilation featured two newly recorded songs: the singles "Bitter Pill" which charted at number 22 on the Mainstream rock charts and "Enslaved" which charted at number 34 on the Billboard Heritage charts.

Track listing 
"Bitter Pill" (Sixx, Lee, Mars, Neil) – 4:27
"Enslaved" (Lee, Mars, Sixx) – 4:30
"Girls, Girls, Girls" – 4:30
"Kickstart My Heart" – 4:44
"Wild Side" – 4:37
"Glitter" (Remix) – 5:40
"Dr. Feelgood" – 4:43
"Same Ol' Situation (S.O.S.)" – 4:14
"Home Sweet Home" – 3:57
"Afraid" – 4:08
"Don't Go Away Mad (Just Go Away)" – 4:40
"Without You" – 4:29
"Smokin' in the Boys Room" – 3:27
"Primal Scream" – 4:46
"Too Fast for Love" – 3:21
"Looks That Kill" – 4:01
" Shout At The Devil '97" – 3:42

Charts

Album

Singles

Certifications

References

External links 

Mötley Crüe compilation albums
1998 greatest hits albums